Jan Jacobus Wouters (born 17 July 1960) is a Dutch professional football coach and former player. He played as a defensive midfielder and was Dutch Footballer of the Year in 1990.

Career
Wouters played for several clubs including PSV, FC Utrecht, Bayern Munich and Ajax. He was also a Netherlands international team member (70 caps, four goals) and was hugely influential in 1988 when the Netherlands won the European Football Championship.

He was a coach of Scottish Premier League club Rangers under Dick Advocaat and then Alex McLeish. He left Rangers at the end of the 2005–06 season along with McLeish and Andy Watson.

Wouters is infamous to England supporters after elbowing Paul Gascoigne and fracturing his cheekbone during a World Cup qualifier in 1993 at Wembley Stadium. Gascoigne was forced to wear a Phantom of the Opera style facemask to protect his fractured cheekbone until his injury healed. The following day, the Daily Mirror newspaper labelled Wouters a "Dutch thug". The match was drawn 2–2 and damaged England's hopes of qualifying for the 1994 World Cup finals in the United States, despite England leading the match 2–0.

Career statistics

Honours
Utrecht
KNVB Cup: 1984–85

Ajax
Eredivisie: 1989–90
KNVB Cup: 1986–87
UEFA Cup Winners' Cup: 1986–87
UEFA Cup: 1991–92

Bayern Munich
Bundesliga: 1993–94

PSV
KNVB Cup: 1995–96

Netherlands
UEFA European Championship: 1988

Individual
Dutch Footballer of the Year: 1989–90
UEFA European Championship Team of the Tournament: 1988
kicker Bundesliga Team of the Season: 1992–93

In popular culture
Wouters was repeatedly referenced in an Saturday Night Live sketch on 4 February 2023.

References

External links

 profile Jan Wouters 
 

1960 births
Living people
Dutch footballers
Footballers from Utrecht (city)
Association football midfielders
Netherlands international footballers
1990 FIFA World Cup players
1994 FIFA World Cup players
UEFA Euro 1988 players
UEFA Euro 1992 players
UEFA European Championship-winning players
UEFA Cup winning players
Bundesliga players
Eredivisie players
FC Utrecht players
FC Bayern Munich footballers
AFC Ajax players
PSV Eindhoven players
Dutch football managers
Eredivisie managers
FC Utrecht managers
AFC Ajax managers
Rangers F.C. non-playing staff
PSV Eindhoven managers
Dutch expatriate footballers
Dutch expatriate sportspeople in Germany
Expatriate footballers in Germany
Dutch expatriate sportspeople in Scotland
Dutch expatriate sportspeople in Turkey